Sib and Suran Castle is a castle in Sib and Suran County in Sistan and Baluchestan Province, and is one of the attractions of Sib and Suran County. This castle was built by the Qajar dynasty.

Sources 

Castles in Iran
Qajar castles
Buildings and structures in Sistan and Baluchestan Province
National works of Iran